Toomelah Station (formerly Toomelah Aboriginal Mission) is an Aboriginal Australian community in the far north of inland New South Wales, Australia within the Boggabilla locality in Moree Plains Shire.  The mission was established in the 1930s. Toomelah is the home of about 300 Gamilaroi people, located north of Moree on the MacIntyre River and is close to the town of Goondiwindi across the border in Queensland.

Following a report by the Human Rights and Equal Opportunity Commission on the community in 1987, there was a public outcry over poor sanitation at Toomelah and action was taken to improve water and housing. In 2008 the Special Commission of Inquiry into Child Protection Services in New South Wales heard evidence of abuse and neglect of children at Toomelah.

In May 2012 the ABC's 7.30 program ran a special report dealing with child abuse, housing and the collapse of social services in Toomelah. In August 2013 a house fire killed a 14-year-old girl while two other children managed to escape.

A specialised unit of the Australian Army was deployed in Toomelah in 2017 to run a six-month works project to restore infrastructure including roads and the community hall.

Notable residents
Singer/songwriter Roger Knox is from Toomelah. In 1994, the Toomelah Tigers rugby team won the Aboriginal NSW Koori Knockout, defeating La Perouse in the grand final.

Toomelah Country Women’s Association
The first Aboriginal branch of the Country Women's Association was established by a Queensland Country Women's Association (QCWA) member from the Goondiwindi district, Una Armstrong. The branch of the CWA was established in 1956, at Boggabilla Aboriginal Station, and was known as Toomelah Country Women's Association. This branch in NSW was supported by Queenslanders because their own by-laws prohibited Aboriginal women from joining their organisation in Queensland. Although it was established on the New South Wales side of the border, the Gwydir CWA reported that "the Queensland folk have taken it under their kindly wing and have promised to help in every way". Toomelah CWA remained a stand-alone initiative in New South Wales until 1959, when it was suggested by an Aboriginal Welfare Board inspector that a branch be formed in the Kempsey area at Green Hill.

References

Aboriginal communities in New South Wales